Arthur Stanley Wint OD MBE (25 May 1920 – 19 October 1992) was a Jamaican Royal Air Force (RAF) pilot during the Second World War, sprinter, physician, and later High Commissioner to the United Kingdom. Competing at the 1948 and 1952 Olympics, whilst a medical student at St Bartholomew's Hospital, London, he won two gold and two silver medals, becoming the first Jamaican Olympic gold medalist.

Biography
Arthur Wint, known as the Gentle Giant, was born in Plowden, Manchester, Jamaica. While at Calabar High School, he ran sprints and did both the high jump and long jump. He later transferred to Excelsior High School, where he finished his secondary education.  In 1937 he was the Jamaica Boy Athlete of the year, and the following year won a gold medal in the 800 metres at the Central American Games in Panama. Saving the money for his flight to europe

In 1942 he joined the British Commonwealth Air Training Plan and set the Canadian 400-metre record while training there. He was sent to Britain for active combat during World War II as a pilot. He left the Royal Air Force in 1947 to study medicine at St Bartholomew's Hospital, through the British further education and vocational training scheme for ex-servicemen.

In the 1948 London Games, Wint won Jamaica's first Olympic gold medal for the 400 metres (46.2 seconds), beating his team-mate Herb McKenley. In the 800 metres he won silver, after American Mal Whitfield's gold. Wint missed a probable third medal when he pulled a muscle in the 4 × 400 metres relay final.

In Helsinki in 1952 he was part of the historic team setting the world record while capturing the gold in the 4 × 400 metres relay. He also won silver in the 800 metres, again coming second to Mal Whitfield.

Wint ran his final race in 1953 at Wembley Stadium, finished his internship, and graduated as a doctor. The following year he was made a Member of the Order of the British Empire (MBE) by Queen Elizabeth II in the 1954 New Year Honours. In 1955 Wint returned to Jamaica, eventually settling in Hanover as the only resident doctor in the parish. In 1973 he was awarded the Jamaica honour of the Order of Distinction. He served as Jamaica's High Commissioner to Britain and ambassador to Sweden and Denmark from 1974 to 1978. He was inducted in the Black Athlete's Hall of Fame in the US (1977), the Jamaica Sports Hall of Fame (1989) and the Central American & Caribbean Athletic Confederation Hall of Fame (2003).

Death and legacy
Wint died on Heroes Day in Linstead, aged 72. His funeral was attended by hundreds of people, including the Jamaican Prime Minister. In 2012, a Blue Heritage Plaque was unveiled at 22 Philbeach Avenue, London, where he lived while studying medicine. At the same event, his daughter launched her book about him, titled The Longer Run.

See also
RAF Bomber Command
Tuskegee Airmen
RAF Bomber Command aircrew of World War II

References

Further reading

External links

 
 
 

1920 births
1992 deaths
Jamaican male sprinters
Jamaican male middle-distance runners
Jamaican general practitioners
Alumni of the Medical College of St Bartholomew's Hospital
People from Manchester Parish
High Commissioners of Jamaica to the United Kingdom
Ambassadors of Jamaica to Sweden
Ambassadors of Jamaica to Denmark
Members of the Order of the British Empire
Royal Air Force pilots of World War II
Recipients of the Order of Distinction
Olympic athletes of Jamaica
Olympic gold medalists for Jamaica
Olympic silver medalists for Jamaica
Olympic gold medalists in athletics (track and field)
Olympic silver medalists in athletics (track and field)
Athletes (track and field) at the 1948 Summer Olympics
Athletes (track and field) at the 1952 Summer Olympics
Medalists at the 1948 Summer Olympics
Medalists at the 1952 Summer Olympics
Central American and Caribbean Games gold medalists for Jamaica
Competitors at the 1938 Central American and Caribbean Games
Competitors at the 1946 Central American and Caribbean Games
Central American and Caribbean Games medalists in athletics
People educated at Calabar High School